Nelson Township is located in Lee County, Illinois. As of the 2010 census, its population was 874 and it contained 439 housing units. Nelson Township was formed from Dixon Township on February 28, 1860.

Geography

Demographics

References

External links
 US Census
 City-data.com
 Cook County Official Site
 Illinois State Archives

Townships in Lee County, Illinois
1860 establishments in Illinois
Populated places established in 1860
Townships in Illinois